Tonči Martić  (born 23 November 1972 in Split) is a Croatian former footballer who played for Hajduk Split and Excelsior Mouscron.

External links
 
 Profile at VI.nl 
 Profile 

1972 births
Living people
Footballers from Split, Croatia
Association football midfielders
Yugoslav footballers
Croatian footballers
HNK Hajduk Split players
NK Istra players
HNK Segesta players
Royal Excel Mouscron players
Croatian Football League players
Belgian Pro League players
Croatian expatriate footballers
Expatriate footballers in Belgium
Croatian expatriate sportspeople in Belgium